My Journey (stylized as My Journey.) is the debut studio album by Australian singer and songwriter Karise Eden, who won the first season of The Voice Australia. It was released on 26 June 2012 by Universal Music Australia. The album debuted at number one on the ARIA Albums Chart and was certified double platinum by the Australian Recording Industry Association for shipments of more than 140,000 copies.

Singles
 "You Won't Let Me" was released as the first and only single from the album on 19 June 2012. The song reached number five on the ARIA Singles Chart and was certified gold by the Australian Recording Industry Association for selling more than 35,000 copies.

Track listing

Charts

Weekly charts

Year-end charts

Decade-end charts

Certifications

Release history

References

2012 debut albums
Karise Eden albums
Universal Music Australia albums